Timothy Alan Hinkley (born 25 May 1946) is an English singer-songwriter, keyboard player and record producer. Born in London, Hinkley started playing in youth club bands in the early 1960s, with bands including the Copains, Boys and the Freeman Five. During this time he turned down an offer to join the Konrads, which featured Davy Jones, who later changed his name to David Bowie. Other early associations were with the Bo Street Runners, Chicago Blues Line and Patto's People.

As a session musician
Hinkley recorded with many artists, including Johnny Hallyday, Steve Marriott, Alvin Lee, Al Stewart, Roger Chapman, Humble Pie, Whitesnake, Dr. Feelgood, Roger Daltrey, Thin Lizzy and Alexis Korner. He was a backing musician for Elkie Brooks and touring American musicians such as Sonny Boy Williamson, Lee Dorsey, Carla Thomas and Ben E. King. Hinkley also toured and recorded as a session musician keyboardist with other artists.

Jody Grind and Boxer
In 1965 he formed the Hammond organ trio Jody Grind with lead guitarist Ivan Zagni and drummer Barry Wilson. They recorded two albums, One Step On in 1969 and Far Canal, which featured Bernie Holland on all guitars and Pete Gavin on drums, in 1970 (album cover details), for the British record label Transatlantic Records. Hinkley also recorded the album Bloodletting (1979), with Boxer.

Hinkley's Heroes
During this period he formed the touring jam band Hinkley's Heroes. It comprised established UK musicians, including Bobby Tench, guitarist Steve Simpson, Mel Collins, Neil Hubbard, John Halsey and bass player Kuma Harada. They were occasionally joined on stage by others such as Phil Collins, Joe Cocker, Kiki Dee and Eric Burdon.

On 17 March 2015, a variation of the lineup appeared as Henry's Heroes at a benefit concert for Henry McCullough at the Half Moon music venue in Putney, London. They were also the backing band for Paul Carrack, Nick Lowe, Andy Fairweather Low, Suggs and Bobby Tench.

iDigtunes
Hinkley founded the music library and songwriting company iDigtunes in the 3rd millennium.

Discography
Al Stewart – Zero She Flies (1970)
Alvin Lee – On the Road to Freedom (1973), In Flight (1974), Nineteen Ninety-Four (1994), Saguitar (2007)
Esther Phillips – Black-Eyed Blues (1973)
Vinegar Joe – Vinegar Joe (1974)
Chapman Whitney – Streetwalkers (1974)
Johnny Hallyday – Rock a Memphis (1975), Phantasm (musical director)
Snafu – All Funked Up (1975)
Tom Waits – BBC Television Special (1975)
Pete Sinfield – Still (1973)
Humble Pie – Street Rats (1975) and The Scrubbers Sessions (1997) producer
Snape – Snape Live (1976)
Thin Lizzy – Jailbreak (1976)
Bad Company – Run with the Pack (1976), Desolation Angels (1979)
Joan Armatrading – Show Some Emotion (1977)
Dr. Feelgood – Sneakin' Suspicion (1977)
David Coverdale – White Snake (1977), Northwinds (1978)
Whitesnake – Snakebite (1978)
The Rolling Stones – Some Girls (1978)
The Who – Quadrophenia, film soundtrack (1979)
Boxer – Bloodletting (1979)
Roger Chapman and The Short List – Live in Hamburg (1979) as musical director and keyboardist, He Was, She Was (1982), Mail Order Magic (1980), The Riffburglar Album, Hyenas Only Laugh For Fun (1981) and Zipper (1986)
Tim Buckley – Morning Glory (2001) and Once I Was (1999) bass guitar
Mr.Lucky – Satisfied: Live In The USATim Hinkley – A Little Bit Of Soul (2003) solo album produced by Dan Penn
Lulu – DVD "Live" (2005)
Heiri Muller – Footsteps (2005)
Hinkley's Heroes – Hinkley's Heroes (2005)
The Geoff Everett Band – The Quick and the Dead (2012)

Other associations
Lulu – musical director on Red Hot & Live: Soul tour (1989).
Van Morrison (1984)
George Harrison. Also co-wrote "Heart and Soul"
Elkie Brooks,  Shooting Star'' (1978)
Korner/Thirup/Hinkley (1976–78)
Lindisfarne

References

External links

 
 
Tim Hinkley Interview – NAMM Oral History Library (2016)

1946 births
Living people
English keyboardists
English record producers
English male singer-songwriters
Singers from London
Streetwalkers members